The 2008 Italy rugby union tour of South Africa and Argentina was a series of matches played in June 2008 in South Africa and Argentina by Italy national rugby union team.

The "Azzurri" lost heavily the first a match against "Springboks", and won afgainst the "Pumas”

Results

First test

Second test

Italy
tour
Italy national rugby union team tours
tour
rugby
Rugby union tours of South Africa
Rugby union tours of Argentina